The 2017 Busan Open was a professional tennis tournament played on hard courts. It was the sixteenth edition of the tournament which was part of the 2017 ATP Challenger Tour. It took place in Busan, South Korea between 15 and 21 May 2017.

Singles main-draw entrants

Seeds
* 1 Rankings as of May 8, 2017.

Other entrants
The following players received wildcards into the singles main draw:
  Chung Hong
  Hong Seong-chan
  Oh Chan-yeong
  Wu Tung-lin

The following player received entry into the singles main draw using a protected ranking:
  Alexander Ward

The following player received entry into the singles main draw as an alternate:
  Sekou Bangoura

The following players received entry from the qualifying draw:
  Liam Broady
  Edward Corrie
  Austin Krajicek
  Raymond Sarmiento

Champions

Singles

 Vasek Pospisil def.  Go Soeda 6–1, 6–2.

Doubles

 Hsieh Cheng-peng /  Peng Hsien-yin def.  Sanchai Ratiwatana /  Sonchat Ratiwatana 7–5, 4–6, [10–8].

References

External links
Official Website

Busan Open
Busan Open
May 2017 sports events in South Korea
Busan